Tell Me Who I Am is a 2019 documentary film directed and produced by the British filmmaker Ed Perkins. It focuses on twin brothers Alex and Marcus Lewis. Alex lost his memory in a motorcycle accident at age 18, and his twin brother helped him recreate his lost memories of his childhood. However, Marcus omits that the twins were sexually abused by their mother and also sexually abused by friends of hers in a child abuse network until the age of 14. The film follows Alex and Marcus in telling their lives' stories from the accident at age 18 to age 32, when the sexual abuse is revealed after their mother's death, to both of them coming to terms with the abuse at age 54. The documentary is based on a 2013 book written by the twins together with Joanna Hodgkin.

The film was commissioned by and aired on Netflix. It received acclaim from critics after its release and was described as "harrowing" and "involving but upsetting".

Synopsis
The documentary is split into three parts. In the first part, the viewer follows Alex trying to solve the mystery of his past and trying to figure out who he is after losing his memory in a motorcycle accident at age 18 in 1982. His twin brother, Marcus, is the only person he remembers after emerging from a coma - including himself. Marcus helps him to reintegrate into life. At first, Alex functions like a child, asking basic questions like, "what is this?" to nearly everything and re-learning how to ride a bike. As he rapidly "matures," Alex begins to ask questions about their childhood. Marcus paints a picture of a happy, wealthy, well-connected family for Alex.

In the second part, Marcus reveals that he omitted a dark family secret from Alex in order to protect him from harrowing memories of their shared past. Marcus further emotionally admits that as he created a fantasy life for Alex, he began to believe it himself and was better-able to suppress his own memories of the family secret.

After their parents both die, the brothers embark on an effort to clean out the vast English estate house they left behind, which is jam-packed with flotsam and jetsam. In the process, Alex finds puzzling items, including a wardrobe filled with sex toys, which Marcus tells him to disregard. The last straw is a photograph Alex finds  in a secret closet in his mother's room of the two boys at age ten, naked and with the heads deleted. Alex confronts Marcus, asking whether their mother had sexually abused them. Marcus simply nods and says nothing more. For the next 20+ years, Marcus refuses to give any further information to Alex about what happened to them, causing Alex further distress and a sense of inability to understand who he is. He becomes obsessed with learning details of his mother's life, and discovers that her entire life revolved around sex.

In the third part, Marcus and Alex sit down together and Marcus reveals that not only did their mother sexually abuse them together in her own bed, but that she also was involved in a child sex ring wherein she volunteered her own sons to other child predators. She would drive one of the boys (never both) to different male "friends" of hers all over Britain and those friends would assault and rape them. This continued up until the age of 14, when Marcus fought back, at which time it stopped for both brothers. Marcus apologizes to Alex for not telling the whole story at age 32, but states that he was not able to do it because he was too traumatized himself, and that denying what had happened helped him forget about it and live a worth-while life.

Background
The documentary film is based on the book with the same name written by the twins and Joanna Hodgkin.

Book 
 Tell Me Who I Am

External links
 
 Trailer for Tell Me Who I Am

References 

2019 films
2019 documentary films
British documentary films
Documentary films about amnesia
Documentary films about child abuse
Documentary films about pedophilia
Films about child sexual abuse
Films about dysfunctional families
Works about dysfunctional families
Netflix original documentary films
2010s English-language films
2010s British films